Ammalo pachycera is a moth of the family Erebidae. It was described by Seitz in 1922. It is found in Bolivia.

References

pachycera
Moths described in 1922
Moths of South America